Hugh Latimer (8 October 1896 – 10 May 1954) was an Australian politician.

He was born in Woollahra, the son of William Fleming Latimer. Educated at a local public school and then at Fort Street High School, he became an accountant. On 8 November 1919 he married Jean McClelland; they had one son. From 1923 to 1954 he was a Woollahra alderman, serving as mayor from 1932 to 1935 and from 1949 to 1951. From 1934 to 1954 he served as a member of the New South Wales Legislative Council, first for the United Australia Party and then as a Liberal. He died at Woollahra in 1954.

References

1896 births
1954 deaths
United Australia Party members of the Parliament of New South Wales
Liberal Party of Australia members of the Parliament of New South Wales
Members of the New South Wales Legislative Council
20th-century Australian politicians
Mayors of Woollahra